David Worrell (born 12 January 1978) is an Irish footballer who played as a right back. Born in Dublin, he played in the Scottish Premier League for Dundee United, and the Football League for Plymouth Argyle and Rotherham United.

Life and career
Worrell signed for Blackburn from Shelbourne in January 1995 but had not made a first team appearance before he moved to Dundee United in March 1999. The right back made nineteen league appearances for the Scottish club before moving to Plymouth Argyle and went on to make over 150 league and cup appearances for the Home Park club during a successful spell in which they gained promotion twice. In May 2005, Worrell's contract was not renewed and he subsequently signed for Rotherham in July. At the end of the 2006–07 season, Worrell was released following Rotherham's relegation from League One, before Dundee announced his signature. In June 2008, Worrell left Dens Park to sign for Montrose, having decided to combine part-time football with another career. He was released by Montrose at the end of the season.

Worrell was part of the Ireland side who finished third in the 1997 FIFA World Youth Championship, featuring in all six matches, and has been capped eighteen times by Republic of Ireland under-21, also captaining the side. In addition, he played once for the Republic of Ireland B team in February 1998 featuring alongside future internationals such as Damien Duff, Richard Dunne and Robbie Keane.

He worked as a financial consultant for Paul Kerr Associates, a company set up by Paul Kerr in 2002 to offer financial advice to professional footballers.

Career statistics
After 12 November 2008

Honours
Plymouth Argyle
Football League Third Division: 2001–02
Football League Second Division: 2003–04

Republic of Ireland
FIFA World Youth Championship Third Place: 1997

References

External links

1978 births
Living people
Association footballers from Dublin (city)
Republic of Ireland association footballers
Republic of Ireland youth international footballers
Republic of Ireland under-21 international footballers
Republic of Ireland B international footballers
Shelbourne F.C. players
Blackburn Rovers F.C. players
Dundee United F.C. players
Plymouth Argyle F.C. players
Rotherham United F.C. players
Dundee F.C. players
Montrose F.C. players
Scottish Premier League players
English Football League players
Scottish Football League players
Association football defenders
Association football fullbacks
Republic of Ireland expatriate association footballers